Practolol (Eraldin, Dalzic, Praktol, Cardiol, Pralon, Cordialina, Eraldina, Teranol) is a selective beta blocker (beta-1 blocker) that has been used in the emergency treatment of cardiac arrhythmias. Practolol is no longer used as it is highly toxic despite the similarity of its chemical formula to propranolol. After its introduction, keratoconjunctivitis sicca, conjunctival scarring, fibrosis, metaplasia, and shrinkage developed in 27 patients as an adverse reaction to practolol. Rashes, nasal and mucosal ulceration, fibrous or plastic peritonitis, pleurisy, cochlear damage, and secretory otitis media also occurred in some cases. Three patients suffered profound visual loss though most retained good vision. Symptoms and signs improved on withdrawal of the drug, but reduction of tear secretion persisted in most patients.

History
The compound was studied by scientists at the Research Department of the ICI Pharmaceuticals Division in Alderley Park with physiologists at the University of Leeds in the early 1970s when it was known as compound ICI 66082; they utilised dogs, cats and rats in their investigations. Earlier research had also been carried out as early as 1967 on this and similar molecules by other research teams also with ICI.

Side effects
Side effects are similar to those of other beta blockers, such as bronchoconstriction, cardiac failure, cold extremities, fatigue and depression, hypoglycaemia.

Furthermore, chronic use of practolol may cause oculomucocutaneous syndrome, a severe syndrome whose signs include conjunctivitis sicca and psoriasiform rashes, otitis and sclerosing serositis. This syndrome has not been observed with other such beta blockers.

Ban
This drug has been withdrawn from the market in India.

Synthesis
The part of the structure coming from (1) is based on paracetamol.

A synthesis is available which relates the absolute configuration of the more potent optical isomer to (+)-lactic acid. The glycerol derivative (2) is available from D-mannitol and retains optical activity as the two 1° alcohol functions are differentially protected. Displacement with sodium p-acetamidophenoxide (1, deprotonated paracetamol) gives 3 which is deprotected with dilute acid, the primary alcohol function is selectively reacted with one molar equivalent of tosyl chloride and pyridine, then treated with NaOH in dimethylsulfoxide to yield 3. Epoxide opening with isopropylamine leads to optically active prolactolol (4).

References

External links 
Scientific information / studies
 Guinea Pig study from 1975
 Liver effect study from 1981
 Study of uses during surgery
 Molecular structure
General information
 

Beta blockers
Acetanilides
N-isopropyl-phenoxypropanolamines
Hepatotoxins
Withdrawn drugs
Isopropylamino compounds